Ansar Ghazwat-ul-Hind is an Al-Qaeda-affiliated Islamist militant group active in Kashmir. The group's stated objective is to create Kashmir as an independent Islamic state under Sharia law and jihad against India.

Background
Zakir Rashid Bhat was an Islamist Kashmiri militant popularly known as Zakir Musa. He was a former field operational commander of Hizbul Mujahedeen. In May 2017, Musa criticized the Hurriyat leaders for calling the Kashmir conflict a political objective rather than a religious one to establish Islamic rule. He warned them not to become a "thorn" in the imposition of Sharia in Kashmir, but after a few hours, Hizbul Mujahideen immediately disassociated itself from Zakir Musa's statement and Zakir Musa in response quit the organization after releasing statements to support his argument that the struggle in Kashmir was not for political purposes. Following Musa's split, Pro-Zakir Musa Kashmiri militants formed a militant faction named Zakir Musa Army 313 to openly support Musa and his "Islamic Rule" ideology. In July 2017 the faction joined Al-Qaeda as Musa was impressed by Al-Qaeda's religious objective of imposing Sharia law in Kashmir and he formed a new cell of Al-Qaeda named Ansar Ghazwat-ul-Hind. In the same month, the Global Islamic Media Front-affiliated Al Hurr media channel of Ansar Ghazwat-ul-Hind claimed that Zakir Musa had been named the head of Ansar Ghazwat-ul-Hind, a newly created cell of Al-Qaeda. After the killing of militant commander Abu Dujana and Arif Lelhari, a statement purported to be from Musa was released. The statement claimed that Abu Dujana and Arif Lelhari left Lashkar-e-Taiba, had joined Al-Qaeda and helped establish a new cell of Al-Qaeda in Kashmir. Officials stated that the voice in the video matched those of the earlier audio clips by Musa, though the state's DGP S.P. Vaid stated there was no way of authenticating the clips even though there were reports that Dujana and Musa were close at the time. Meanwhile, an audio clip circulated on media that claimed to be the last message from Dujana and Arif during their encounter. Two voices claim allegiance to Al-Qaeda; however, no gunfire is heard and the authenticity of the clip was not proven. Zakir Musa was one of the most wanted militants in Jammu and Kashmir after Burhan Wani with a bounty of 1 million Indian rupees on his head announced by the Government of India. In November 2017 the Ansar Ghazwat-ul-Hind formed an alliance with Hizbul Mujahideen. After the meeting of Riyaz Naikoo with Ansar Ghazwat-ul-Hind, Zakir Musa released an audio tape after a few days of meetings, where he called all Kashmiri Mujahideen groups to unite for Jihad against enemies of Islam, with the goal to achieve freedom from India and enforce a Sharia law-based Islamic revolution in the region. He also warned 'Don't forget Kashmir if Pakistan withdraws its support to Kashmir, the insurgency would be also fought inside Pakistan'. Afterwards, Syed Salahuddin, the chief of Hizbul Mujahideen, released a statement threatening the Pakistan Army: 'We are fighting for Kashmiri Muslims in Kashmir and if Pakistan army withdraws its support, the war would be fought inside Pakistan too'.

Objective
In 2017 Al-Qaeda-affiliated Global Islamic Media Front released a video announcing Al Hurr as the channel of Ansar Ghazwat-ul-Hind. It also claimed that the group's objective was to impose Sharia law upon Kashmir, also declaring Jihad against India in the process.

Etymology
The group derives its name from the Islamic prophecy of Ghazwa-e-Hind, the ultimate conquest of India. "Ansar" means supporters.

Slogans
Ansar Ghazwat-ul-Hind claims to have two slogans: the first being "Kashmir Banega Darul Islam" (Kashmir will become Islamic state) and the second being "Sharyiat ya shahadat" (Sharia or martyrdom).

Allegiance to Al-Qaeda & Taliban
In July 2017, the Global Islamic Media Front Affiliated Al Hurr media Channel of Ansar Ghazwat-ul-Hind claimed that Zakir Musa had been named the head of Ansar Ghazwat-ul-Hind under the allegiance to Al-Qaeda. In September 2021, The group released a letter on social media in which group announced allegiance to Afghan Taliban after the takeover in Afghanistan.

Activities, affiliation, and foreign fighters

Activities and affiliation

2017
On 17 november 2017, two militants open fire against a police checkpoint in Zakura, Jammu and Kashmir, at least two people were killed (one police and an attacker), and other officer left wounded, the Tehrik al-Mojahedin claimed responsibility for the incident, while Islamic State – Khorasan Province claimed responsibility; however, the authorities questioned the veracity of this claim, suspecting that Ansar Ghazwat-ul-Hind carried out the attack.

On 7 December 2017, the group released a statement that condemned United States President Donald Trump's declaration of moving the United States embassy in Israel from Tel Aviv to Jerusalem.

On 4 December, an armed assailants raided a bank in Noorpora, stolen ₹97,256 rupees and leaving only material damages. 

On 25 December 2017, in a video of a Kashmiri militant declaring allegiance to the Islamic State of Iraq and the Levant and declaring a new ISIL Province in Kashmir, the fighter called on Ansar Ghazwat-ul-Hind to ally with or give allegiance to ISIL and wage Jihad in Kashmir against the Indian government but the group declined.

2018
On February 2018, the group released a video of Zakir Musa calling on Indian Muslims to attack Indian army patrols and checkpoints as well as companies interested in investing in India. 

On 12 February, the group Assailants opened fire on Mohammad Yousuf Rather's vehicle in Charangam, Budgam district. The victim a Power Development Department clerk and an All Parties Hurriyat Conference (APHC) activist, was killed in the attack. the group claimed responsibility for the incident and stated that the attack was carried out to deter Hurriyat parties from practicing secularism.

On 25 February, the group militants attacked a police officer guarding the residence of Fazal Haq Qureshi, leader of the All Parties Hurriyat Conference (APHC), in Soura neighborhood Srinagar, Jammu and Kashmir, the officer was killed and his rifle was stolen after the attack, the Islamic State Khorasan claimed responsibility for the attack; but authorities doubted the veracity of this claim, as Ansar Ghazwat-ul-Hind separately claimed responsibility for the attack, further the authorities claimed that the assailant named Eisa Fazli was affiliated with Tehrik al-Mujahedin, Lashkar-e-Taiba and Hizbul Mujahideen. 

On 15 March, the group militants attacked Mohammad Anwar Khan, who is the leader of the Bharatiya Janata Party (BJP), in Balhama, Jammu and Kashmir. Khan was uninjured, although one of his bodyguards was injured in the attack. In addition, two assailants were killed and a Central Reserve Police Force (CRPF) officer was injured in the ensuing confrontation with security forces. Ansar Ghazwat-ul-Hind claimed responsibility for the incident hours later.

On April 2018, the group published material that encouraged Muslims across India and Kashmir to carry out lone wolf attacks. 

On 8 September 2018, the group assailants shot dead Hakeem-ur-Rehman Sultani, member of All Parties Hurriyat Conference (APHC), in Bomai, Jammu and Kashmir for his Secular ideology. the group claimed responsibility for the attack, although sources attribute the attack to Lashkar-e-Taiba (LeT).

On 12 September 2018, an unknown assailants threw four thrown cracker-like explosive devices explosive devices at a police station in Jalandhar, Punjab, at least two police officers were injured in the blasts, the Bhindranwale Tiger Force of Khalistan (BTHK) claimed responsibility for the attack, though authorities questioned the veracity of this claim, Sources also attributed the attack to Ansar Ghazwat-ul-Hind. 

On 18 November 2018, an militia armed men threw grenades and opened fire at a Central Reserve Police Force (CRPF) camp in Kakapora, Jammu and Kashmir, at least one CRPF member was killed and two others were injured in the attack, Jaish-e-Mohammad (JeM) claimed responsibility for the attack, but authorities suspected the attack was carried out by Ansar Ghazwat-ul-Hind.

2019
On 21 November 2019, the group released an audio tape condemning the Indian court ruling on the Babri Masjid. The group urged Muslims to retaliate against the decision.

2020
On 6 January 2020, the group released a video audio tape message to Muslims of Kashmir and India by Talha Abdul Rahman the Spokesperson of group condemning the 2020 Delhi riots by Hindu nationalists against the Indian Muslims in Dehli. The group urged Muslims to United against Hindutva ideology and he called Muslims to join the Jihad against the enemies of Islam. 

On 9 February, the militants shot and killed Ghulam Nabi, a contractor, outside his home in Tral, Jammu and Kashmir. No group claimed responsibility for the incident; however, the authorities blamed the attack on Hizbul Mujahideen (HM) and Ansar Ghazwat-ul-Hind (AGH), Days later three Ansar Ghazwat-ul-Hind militants were killed in a clash with security forces.

2021
On 11 February 2021, militant armed assailants barged into a Hindu politician's home who was the Senior member of Bharatiya Janata Party (BJP) and pro-Hindutva activist in Jammu and Kashmir. The assailants opened fire on him, he was killed along with his family although his bodyguards were beheaded by assailants with sword, the Jammu and Kashmir Police and authorities suspected the Islamic State Jammu and Kashmir behind the incident, however the Ansar Ghazwat-ul-Hind claimed responsibility for the incident hours later in what was believed to have been a reprisal for 2020 Delhi riots against the Indian Muslims in Delhi by Hindu nationalists the group calls for liberation of Kashmir from Hindutva, further the authorities claimed that the some assailants was affiliated with Jaish-e-Mohammad, Lashkar-e-Taiba and Al-Badr.

2022
On 18 January 2022, the group claimed responsibility for the attempted bomb attack in Ghazipur, Delhi the group also claimed that the our targets are pro-Hindutva Hindu nationalists in revenge for the 2020 Delhi riots against the Indian Muslims in Delhi by Hindu nationalists.

On 11 December 2022, the group claimed responsibility of russian-made RPG attack in Punjab on Tarn Taran Police station. The group said that they had fired a rocket from the Amritsar-Bathinda Highway. Earlier on Saturday, Sikhs for Justice (SFJ), a Khalistani Insurgent militant organisation, claimed responsibility for the attack. The indian authorities has named this attack as Pakistani agenda for preparation of more attacks on Punjab, India Neighbouring nation wants to bleed India with thousand cuts, says Punjab DGP.

Foreign fighters
The Ansar Ghazwat-ul-Hind also have large number of foreign fighters In Kashmir from Pakistan & Afghanistan were called to join the holy war against the India.

Operations against Ansar Ghazwat-ul-Hind

On 21 December 2018, the group's deputy leader Soliha Mohammad Akhoon, also known as Rehaan Khan, was killed in an encounter with 42 Rashtriya Rifles and CRPF along with five other militants.

On 24 May 2019, Indian security forces killed Zakir Musa in an encounter in Tral region of Jammu and Kashmir. Security forces had to blast a chemist's house where Musa was hiding. The owner was sent in for negotiation to surrender, but Musa declined. At Zakir Musa's funeral, thousands of people attended Zakir Musa's funeral, and there were protests by supporters or people who mourned the death of the militant.

On 22 October 2019, Indian security forces killed Hameed Lehari in an encounter in Awantipora, Jammu and Kashmir. He was the second leader of the organisation.

Jammu and Kashmir's Director General of Police, Dilbag Singh, said that the Ansar Ghazwat-ul-Hind has been "wiped out of Kashmir" on 23 October 2019.

On 22 April 2020, four militants of the group were killed in Shopian district's Melhora village during an encounter with Indian Army's 55 Rashtriya Rifles and the CRPF. Two over-ground workers of Ansar Ghazwat-ul-Hind had been captured in Pulwama district on 22 May.

On 29 April 2020, Group's deputy chief Burhan Koka was killed in an encounter in Shopian's Melhora area along with 2 other associates.

On 9 April 2021, Jammu and Kashmir's Director General of Police, Dilbag Singh, said that the Ansar Ghazwat-ul-Hind has been "wiped out of Kashmir" for a second time, after 7 militants including its chief were killed in an encounter.

On 11 July 2021, Prashant Kumar, ADG Law and Order, UP, said, “ATS UP has uncovered a big militant module. The team has arrested two militant linked with al-Qaeda's Ansar Ghazwat-ul-Hind.”

On 14 June 2022, Jammu and Kashmir Police said Abdullah Abbas Ghazi Bhat, also known as Abdullah Ghazi, was a main militant of Islamist militant group Ansar Ghazwat-ul-Hind, an al-Qaeda linked group. Police said he was reportedly had been killed with two Hizbul militants by Indian security forces during a search operation on 11 June.He had been fighting alongside Hizbul Mujahideen militants in Kulgam he was killed in a gunfight in the town of Kulgam the two Indian security forces also killed and five injured during the clash. The fighting was so intense that it partially security forces destroyed his home. On 14 June a few days after his death, four Indian army soldiers were killed and the main leading member of search operation Ashkan Kumar a Jammu and Kashmir Police senior officer also murdered outside his home in what was believed to have been a reprisal for Abdullah's death.

See also
 Hizbul Mujahideen
 Ghazwa-e-Hind
 Lashkar-e-Taiba
 Jaish-e-Mohammed
 Taliban
 Osama bin Laden

References

Jihadist groups in Jammu and Kashmir
Kashmir separatist movement
Organisations designated as terrorist by India
Anti-Hindu sentiment
Groups affiliated with al-Qaeda